The Farman F.80 was a 1920s French biplane designed by Farman as a basic trainer.

Development
The F.80 was intended to compete against the Hanriot HD-14 as a basic trainer. It was an equal span two-bay tractor biplane with tandem open cockpits for instructor and pupil. It had a tailskid landing gear with the two main units widely spaced for stability on the ground. The aircraft also had a pair of auxiliary wheels in front to prevent the aircraft nosing-over on the ground and damaging what was then an expensive wooden propeller.

The aircraft did not meet with any success and was not ordered into production.

Specifications

Notes

Bibliography

1920s French military trainer aircraft
F.0080
Biplanes